The Engineering Council (formerly Engineering Council UK; colloquially known as EngC) is the UK's regulatory authority for registration of Chartered and Incorporated engineers and engineering technician, holding a register of these and providing advice to students, engineers, employers and academic institutions on the standards for registration and procedures for registration. It is also responsible for the accreditation of educational and training programs, delegating this responsibility to licensed member institutions.

History

Professional engineering institutions in the UK began in 1818 with the formation of the Institution of Civil Engineers. The IMechE was formed next in 1847. The IEE (Later Renamed as IET) was formed in 1871. These three are known as the Big Three institutions since together they represent 80% of registered UK engineers.

The Joint Council of Engineering Institutions was formed in 1964, which later became the Council of Engineering Institutions (CEI) in November 1965, which had a royal charter. This provided all the main functions that the EngC now provides, but was more ineffectual. Around this time, 33% of the UK's GDP was in manufacturing, lowering to 29% in the early 1970s.

Finniston report
A royal commission, from the committee of inquiry into the engineering profession, chaired by Sir Monty Finniston, was set up in 1977. It looked at the formation and registration of engineers, producing the Finniston Report - Engineering our Future in 1980. Engineering institutions thought they may have lost their autonomy. There was also the possibility of statutory licensing (direct government control) of engineers, as other professional practitioners such as doctors and architects, but the work of engineers is more confined to work with other engineering companies, providing a nominal level of inherent professional self-regulation against misconduct. Keith Joseph at the DTI chose not to have a statutory body, but have a royal charter.

From its recommendations, the Engineering Council was established in 1981, watching over 54 separate institutions. It gained a royal charter on 27 November 1981. The first chairman was Sir Kenneth Corfield, followed by Francis Tombs, Baron Tombs in 1985, Sir William Barlow in 1988, Sir John Fairclough in 1991, Dr. Alan Rudge in 1996 and Dr. Robert Hawley in 1999.

It formed the WISE Campaign in 1983 to encourage women to become engineers. In 1996, the diamond logo was replaced by a circle.

Function
Engineering Council is recognized by the British Government as the national representative body of the engineering profession in the United Kingdom, working in partnership with other engineering institutions. The Engineering Council regulates the professions of chartered engineer, incorporated engineer and engineering technician in the UK.

Professional registration in the UK
UK legislation is generally 'permissive' and, as such, the title engineer is not protected by law therefore anyone can call themselves an engineer or professional engineer or registered engineer and many semi-skilled and unskilled trades adopt this title. However the 'professional' titles awarded by the Engineering Council are protected by law. Registration as a chartered and incorporated engineers or as engineering technicians is voluntary and candidates are required to demonstrate a high standard of professional competence acquired through education, training and responsible experience in order to register. There are four categories of registration:

 Chartered Engineer (CEng)
 Incorporated Engineer (IEng)
 Engineering Technician (EngTech)
 Information and Communications Technology Technician (ICTTech)

Assessment for registration is typically carried out on Engineering Council's behalf by a licensed member institution.

The Engineering Technician (EngTech) may obtain the Licentiateship (with post nominals LCGI), a City and Guilds award comparable to a level 4 qualification.
The Incorporated Engineer (IEng) may obtain the Graduateship (GCGI) in engineering, comparable to a level 6 qualification.
The Chartered Engineer (CEng) may obtain the Membership (MCGI) in engineering, comparable to a level 7 qualification.

Licensed member institutions
 Chartered Association of Building Engineers
 Institute of Acoustics
 Royal Aeronautical Society
 Institution of Agricultural Engineers
 Chartered Institution of Building Services Engineers
 Chartered Institution of Civil Engineering Surveyors
 Institute of Cast Metals Engineers
 Institution of Chemical Engineers
 Institution of Civil Engineers
 British Computer Society
 Institution of Engineering and Technology
 Energy Institute
 Institution of Engineering Designers
 Society of Environmental Engineers
 Institution of Fire Engineers
 Institution of Gas Engineers and Managers
 Institute of Healthcare Engineering and Estate Management
 Institute of Highway Engineers
 Chartered Institution of Highways and Transportation
 Institute of Marine Engineering, Science and Technology
 Institute of Materials, Minerals and Mining
 Institute of Measurement and Control
 Institution of Mechanical Engineers
 Royal Institution of Naval Architects
 British Institute of Non-Destructive Testing
 Nuclear Institute
 Society of Operations Engineers
 Permanent Way Institution
 Institute of Physics
 Institute of Physics and Engineering in Medicine
 Chartered Institute of Plumbing and Heating Engineering
 Institution of Railway Signal Engineers
 The Institution of Royal Engineers
 The Safety and Reliability Society
 Institution of Structural Engineers
 Chartered Institution of Water and Environmental Management
 The Welding Institute

International registration
Engineering Council is a "designated authority" under the implementing regulations for Directive 2005/36/EC. It is a member of the European Federation of National Engineering Associations (FEANI).
Engineering Council has relationships with many similar organizations worldwide.
It has responsibility for the UK sections of two international registers:

 FEANI's register of European Engineers
 The International Register of Professional Engineers (IRPE/IRoPE)

European Engineer registration entitles the holder to use the European-style prefix title EurIng; International Professional Engineer registration entitles the holder to use the suffix IntPE (UK). The qualifications required for international registration are similar to those required for CEng registration.

References

Further reading

External links
 EngC official website
 The EngC YouTube channel

1981 establishments in the United Kingdom
Engineering education in the United Kingdom
Engineering societies based in the United Kingdom
Organisations based in the London Borough of Camden
Organizations established in 1981
Professional associations based in the United Kingdom
Professional certification in engineering
Regulators of the United Kingdom
Science and technology in the United Kingdom